The African Diaspora Archaeology Newsletter is a quarterly scholarly newsletter that covers the subject of the African diaspora as well as related archaeological and historical studies.

History

The journal was founded as the African-American Archaeology Newsletter in 1994, and changed its name to the current title in 2000.

References

External links 
 Full-text copies of issues 10 - 26 (1994 - 2000) under the journal's previous title, African-American Archaeology Newsletter.

African studies journals
Archaeology journals
Publications established in 1994